Jan Pahor  (born 10 June 1986) is a Slovenian footballer who plays as a defender.

He began his professional career at the age of 18 with the Slovenian side Koper. With Koper, he won the Slovenian Football Cup in 2006. In January 2009, he joined the Romanian Liga I team Farul Constanţa.

References

External links
 PrvaLiga profile 
 

1986 births
Living people
Sportspeople from Koper
Slovenian footballers
Association football defenders
Slovenian Second League players
Slovenian PrvaLiga players
FC Koper players
ND Gorica players
FCV Farul Constanța players
NK Ivančna Gorica players
NK Ankaran players
Nea Salamis Famagusta FC players
Slovenian expatriate footballers
Liga I players
Cypriot Second Division players
Expatriate footballers in Romania
Slovenian expatriate sportspeople in Romania
Expatriate footballers in Cyprus
Slovenian expatriate sportspeople in Cyprus
Expatriate footballers in Italy
Slovenian expatriate sportspeople in Italy
Slovenia youth international footballers
Slovenia under-21 international footballers